Fleur Vermeiren (born 21 June 2002) is a Belgian swimmer. She competed in the women's 50 metre breaststroke at the 2019 World Aquatics Championships. She qualified to compete in the semi-finals but she did not qualify to compete in the final.

References

External links
 

2002 births
Living people
Belgian female breaststroke swimmers
Place of birth missing (living people)
21st-century Belgian women